The Grand Bell Awards, also known as Daejong Film Awards, are determined and presented annually by The Motion Pictures Association of Korea for excellence in film in South Korea. The Grand Bell Awards were first presented in 1962 and have gained prestige as the Korean equivalent of the American Academy Awards.

45th ceremony
The 45th Grand Bell Awards ceremony was held at the COEX Convention Hall in Seoul on June 27, 2008 and hosted by Kim Ah-joong and announcer Choi Ki-hwan.

Nominations and winners
(Winners denoted in bold)

References

External links 
 

Grand Bell Awards
Grand Bell Awards
Grand Bell Awards